Boesiger or Bösiger is a surname. Notable people with the surname include:

Christian Bösiger (born 1984), Swiss badminton player
Johannes Boesiger (born 1962), German writer and producer
Roy Boesiger, Swiss para-alpine skier